Jeanick Fournier is a Canadian singer from Saguenay, Quebec, most noted as the winner of the second season of Canada's Got Talent.

Fournier, who works as a palliative care attendant in Saguenay and is the adoptive mother of two children with Down syndrome, grew up in the small town of Dolbeau-Mistassini and later moved to the Saguenay borough of Chicoutimi in adulthood. She has performed in Quebec for a number of years, most notably in a Céline Dion tribute show.

In 2012, Jeanick Fournier was approached to participate in the french show's second season The Voice: la plus belle voix. She has been on tour since 2006 with a show entirely devoted to Celine Dion. Fournier is directly selected to be one of the 140 finalists. Having revealed her selection to the press, her audition was canceled the next day.

In 2019, she also launched Cinq divas, a show in which her Dion repertoire was supplemented with songs by Ginette Reno, Lara Fabian, Whitney Houston and Lady Gaga. She released the album Mes coups de cœur, a collection of covers of some of her favourite songs which included one original song written by Fournier and Véronique Gagné, in 2015.

Canada's Got Talent
In her first Canada's Got Talent appearance, she auditioned with Dion's "I Surrender", and was given the golden buzzer by host Lindsay Ell. On her first day back at her job in palliative care after the appearance, she sang Dion's "S'il suffisait d'aimer" for one of her patients, attracting additional media attention when the patient's daughter uploaded a video of the performance to social media; a few days later, her first musical performance since the television appearance, at the Calypso club in the Saguenay borough of Jonquière, attracted a record audience, with fully 40 per cent of the patrons indicating that they had bought tickets to the show after seeing her Canada's Got Talent performance.

In the semifinals she performed the song "Never Enough" from the film The Greatest Showman, and in the finale she performed Queen's "The Show Must Go On". She was announced the final winner, over dance troupe The Renegades in third place and singer-songwriter Kellie Loder in second place.

Performances and results

Post-Talent
After her appearances on Canada's Got Talent, Fournier signed with the record company Universal Music Canada. Her self-titled major label debut album was released in October 2022, and debuted at #13 on the Canadian Albums Chart. 

The album includes duets with Ell on a cover of Faith Hill's song "Paris", and Maxime Landry on a cover of Daniel Balavoine's "Tous les cris, les S.O.S.", as well as "I Surrender" and songs first recorded by Amanda Marshall, Roxette, Sam Brown, Laurence Jalbert and Cyndi Lauper.

In November 2022, it was confirmed that Fournier will be a competitor in the 2023 season of America's Got Talent: All-Stars.

In 2023, she participated in an all-star recording of Serena Ryder's single "What I Wouldn't Do", which was released as a charity single to benefit Kids Help Phone's Feel Out Loud campaign for youth mental health.

Discography

Albums

Singles

References

External links

Jeanick Fournier at AllMusic

21st-century Canadian women singers
Canadian women rock singers
Canadian women pop singers
French Quebecers
Singers from Quebec
People from Dolbeau-Mistassini
Musicians from Saguenay, Quebec
Canada's Got Talent winners
Living people
Year of birth missing (living people)